Carpenter Street may refer to:

Places
Carpenter Street School, Woodbury, Gloucester County, New Jersey
Carpenter Street, Evansville, Indiana, site of Willard Carpenter House
Carpenter Street, Philadelphia, site of Sparks Shot Tower
Carpenter Street, Rehoboth, site of Carpenter House (Rehoboth, Massachusetts)
Carpenter Street, Singapore, site of SAFRA National Service Association
Carpenter Street, Chicago, named after Philo Carpenter

Film and TV
Carpenter Street (Star Trek: Enterprise), referring to Carpenter Street, Detroit